Ryan Stuart Clayton Inniss (born 5 June 1995) is an English professional footballer who plays as a centre back for  club Charlton Athletic.

An England under-16 and under-17 international, he turned professional at Crystal Palace in 2011. He had a number of loan spells at Cheltenham Town, Luton Town, Gillingham, Yeovil Town, Port Vale, Southend United, Colchester United, Dundee and Newport County. He joined Charlton Athletic on a free transfer in October 2020.

Club career

Crystal Palace
Inniss joined the Crystal Palace youth academy at the age of 14 and signed his first professional contract two years later. He captained the club's youth team during the 2012–13 season.

Cheltenham Town loan 
Inniss joined League Two side Cheltenham Town on 1 August 2013 on a month's loan; this was later extended for a further month. "Robins" manager Mark Yates said that Inniss had "been on our radar for six months now". Standing in for the injured Troy Brown, Inniss made his professional debut on 27 August 2013 in Cheltenham's 2–1 League Cup defeat against West Ham United. He impressed, despite suffering a facial injury. He made his first appearance in the English Football League four days later against Bury. On 13 September 2013, Inniss had his loan spell at Cheltenham terminated due to injury. After recovering, he was an unused substitute for Crystal Palace in a 3–1 loss to Liverpool in the Premier League on 5 October 2013.

Luton Town loan 
On 10 January 2014, Inniss joined Conference Premier leaders Luton Town on a one-month loan, having been a "number one target" for "Hatters" manager John Still. He scored with his first touch five minutes into his Luton debut in a 2–2 FA Trophy draw with Cambridge United. He returned to Crystal Palace after playing in three matches for the club. On 14 February 2014, he joined League One side Gillingham on a loan deal lasting until the end of the season, making his debut against Sheffield United in a 1–0 defeat. He picked up an injury in the game, which limited him to just two further appearances for the "Gills".

Yeovil Town loan 
On 16 October 2014, Inniss joined Yeovil Town on a one-month loan deal, later extended until 20 December 2014. "Glovers" manager Gary Johnson had signed him on the recommendation of Tony Pulis. On 29 November, he was sent off for the first time in his career for a two-footed challenge on Kyel Reid in a 2–0 defeat by Preston North End at Huish Park. On 6 January 2015, Inniss returned to Crystal Palace after being recalled from his loan spell at Yeovil having made six appearances.

Port Vale loan 
On 12 February 2015, Inniss joined Port Vale on a one-month loan deal. He made his debut two days later, helping the "Valiants" to keep their first clean sheet in three months with a 1–0 win over Walsall. He collected five yellow cards in five starts during his stay at Vale Park, helping the team to concede just two goals whilst he was on the pitch, but his loan spell was not extended as he damaged his ankle ligaments during his final appearance.

After being linked with a return to Burslem for many weeks, his arrival on loan at Port Vale for the entirety of the 2015–16 season was confirmed on 27 July. He started the 2015–16 season competing with Remie Streete and Richard Duffy for one of two available centre-back places. He was in good form at the start of the campaign, and also managed to significantly improve his disciplinary record. He dislocated his shoulder in September and returned to Selhurst Park for treatment, though his loan deal to Port Vale remained active. He returned to Vale shortly after Christmas. However he picked up a hamstring injury in a home draw with Coventry City on 7 February, and was ruled out of action for three weeks. He returned to Crystal Palace after a re-occurrence of his hamstring injury in a defeat to Barnsley on 28 March. Page described him as "the unluckiest player I think I have ever met with injuries".

Southend United loan 
On 31 August 2016, he joined League One side Southend United on loan for the rest of the 2016–17 season. He had a difficult start to the campaign, and after returning to Southend following his release from prison he went on to dislocate his shoulder in an FA Cup defeat to Millwall, and was ruled out of action for three months following surgery. On 25 February, he was sent off for two yellow card offences in a 2–1 loss at Gillingham, though manager Phil Brown strongly criticised the decision and said it was "unbelievable refereeing". On 4 April, he dislocated his shoulder for the second time of the season in a 1–0 defeat to Bolton Wanderers at Roots Hall.

Colchester United loan 
On 31 August 2017, he joined League Two side Colchester United on loan for the rest of the 2017–18 season. He made his Colchester debut in a 3–1 win over Crawley Town at the Colchester Community Stadium on 9 September. He made 19 appearances for John McGreal's "U's" across the 2017–18 season and was named in the EFL team of the week for his performance in a 1–0 win at Barnet on 11 November.

Crystal Palace debut and Dundee loan 
Inniss made his Crystal Palace debut on 28 August 2018, playing in the entirety of the club's 1–0 win at Swansea City in the EFL Cup. He admitted his "surprise" at finally making his senior debut for the club and said "I can only thank those people at the club who have helped me off the field through some tough times". However manager Roy Hodgson did not name him in his 25-man Premier League squad, and three days later he joined Scottish Premiership side Dundee on loan until the end of the 2018–19 season. He started the season in the "Dens" starting eleven, but fell out of the first-team picture after Jim McIntyre replaced Neil McCann as manager in October. He did manage to force his way back into the team in January, alongside Genséric Kusunga, after Darren O'Dea was suspended and Andrew Davies picked up an injury. However his loan at Dens Park was ended early on 31 January, with Inniss returning to Palace having played 13 games for Dundee.

Newport County loan 
On 23 August 2019, Inniss joined League Two side Newport County on loan until the end of the 2019–20 season. On 31 August, he was praised for his debut for Newport, being named in the starting line up and playing a positive role in the 2–0 League Two win against Forest Green Rovers. His second appearance for Newport was as a 59th-minute substitute in the EFL Trophy 5–4 defeat against West Ham United U21s on 4 September, in which he was sent off for allegedly biting 18-year old Reece Hannam. This was the second red received by Inniss during his career. Newport manager Michael Flynn stated after the match that if the accusation was true, it was "inexcusable and I will not be fighting his corner". On 6 September, Inniss was charged with violent conduct by the FA. Inniss was available and played in Newport's next League Two fixture the following day, a 1–0 win against Port Vale. He was subsequently suspended for five matches. He scored his first goal for Newport in a 2–1 win over Bradford City at Rodney Parade on 22 February; he was also named on the EFL team of the week. However he received his second red card of the season for a two-footed challenge on Joshua Kayode in a 2–0 defeat at Carlisle United on 10 March.

Charlton Athletic
On 13 October 2020, Inniss joined League One club Charlton Athletic on a two-year deal; "Addicks" chairman Thomas Sandgaard said that "Ryan is a player that [director of football] Steve Gallen has been following for a very long time and he fits in with what [manager] Lee [Bowyer] and Steve are trying to do". He was sent off for receiving two yellow cards in a 2–0 win over Oxford United at The Valley on 27 October. The following month he injured a quad muscle in training and was sidelined for the next five months. Speaking in April, new manager Nigel Adkins said that the defender's long-standing injury record would be addressed. Inniss scored his first goal for the club on 4 May, in a 3–1 win against Lincoln City.

A thigh issue caused him to be sidelined from late-August until Christmas in 2021. On 5 April 2022, he was shown a straight red card for a reckless challenge on AFC Wimbledon midfielder George Marsh just seven minutes after entering the game as a substitute. Manager Johnnie Jackson said that Inniss had made "a bad mistake" but stressed that it would not effect the decision whether or not to extend his contract in the summer. Later that month he was recognised for his charity work as League One's 2022 PFA Player in the Community. Despite featuring just seventeen times in the 2021–22 campaign, his contract was extended by a further year.

International career
Inniss has represented England at under-16 and under-17 level, scoring the winning goal in England U16's 2–1 Victory Shield win over Scotland U16 in 2011. He is also eligible to represent Trinidad and Tobago at international level, through his Trinidadian-born father.

Style of play
A vocal player, Cheltenham Town centre-back partner Steve Elliott described him as "a typical modern-day centre-half: tall, athletic and aggressive". He has struggled with various injuries throughout his career.

Personal life
Inniss had a troubled childhood, as his mother's drug dependency and his father's imprisonment left him to raise his two younger siblings as a teenager. He has three police cautions: one for a public order offence in 2011, one for common assault in August 2015 and one for being drunk and disorderly and resisting a police constable in March 2015. On 9 September 2016, Inniss pleaded guilty to assault following an incident in a bar four months earlier; he was sentenced to 14 weeks in prison. He was released three days later after successfully appealing his sentence, which was suspended for 18 months; he was also handed 240 hours unpaid work, a £300 fine, and ordered to take part in a 20-day alcohol rehabilitation course.

Career statistics

References

External links

1995 births
Living people
People from Penge
English sportspeople of Trinidad and Tobago descent
English footballers
England youth international footballers
Association football defenders
Crystal Palace F.C. players
Cheltenham Town F.C. players
Luton Town F.C. players
Gillingham F.C. players
Yeovil Town F.C. players
Port Vale F.C. players
Southend United F.C. players
Colchester United F.C. players
Dundee F.C. players
Newport County A.F.C. players
Charlton Athletic F.C. players
English Football League players
National League (English football) players
Scottish Professional Football League players
English people convicted of assault